Jagdish Choudhary (born 1941 or 1942; died 21 July 2014) was an Indian politician, a member of the Bihar Legislative Assembly.

A socialist with a history of participation in the Janata Party, Choudhary served three terms in the Bihar Legislative Assembly from the Darbhanga Rural constituency; he was elected in 1977  and 1980 as a member of that party, then in 1990 as a member of the Janata Dal.

Choudhary was married and had five children including two sons, first names being Rahul and Rohit.

References

1940s births
2014 deaths
Members of the Bihar Legislative Assembly
Janata Party politicians
Janata Dal politicians
People from Darbhanga